The 68HC08 (HC08 in short) is a broad family of 8-bit microcontrollers originally from Motorola Semiconductor, later from Freescale Semiconductor.

HC08's are fully code-compatible with their predecessors, the Motorola 68HC05.  Like all Motorola processors that share lineage from the 6800, they use the von Neumann architecture as well as memory-mapped I/O.  This family has five CPU registers that are not part of the memory.  One 8-bit accumulator A, a 16-bit index register H:X, a 16-bit stack pointer SP, a 16-bit program counter PC, and an 8-bit condition code register CCR.  Some instructions refer to the different bytes in the H:X index register independently.

Among the HC08's there are dozens of processor families, each targeted to different embedded applications.  Features and capabilities vary widely, from 8 to 64-pin processors, from LIN connectivity to USB 1.1. A typical and general purpose device from the HC08 family of units is the  microcontroller M68HC908GP32.

The Freescale RS08 core is a simplified, "reduced-resource" version of the HC08.

The Freescale HCS08 core is the next generation of the same processors.

External links 
 M68HC08 Family Reference Manual - archive.org
 HC08 Processor Families
 Helium Open-Source RTOS for HCS08 MCUs
 Digital Core Design 68HC08 - HDL IP Core
 Win/Linux/DOS-based freeware macro cross-assembler (ASM8)
 Example assembly language code written for ASM8
 Educational material for the HC08

Motorola microcontrollers
Freescale Semiconductor microcontrollers